Ranadaprasad Shaha (also RP Shaha; 15 November 1896 – May 1971) was a Bangladeshi businessman and philanthropist. He founded educational institutes like Bharateswari Homes, Kumudini College and Debendra College. During the Bangladesh Liberation War, he was picked up from home by the Pakistani army on 7 May 1971 and never returned.

Early life 
Saha was born on 15 November 1896. Debendranath Podder, Saha's father, originated from Mirzapur in Tangail subdivision in Mymensingh District. Saha was born in his maternal uncle's house at Kachhur in Savar, near Dhaka. At the age of seven, he lost his mother, Kumudini Devi, who died of tetanus during childbirth. At the age of sixteen, he fled to Kolkata and initially worked as a day labourer, rickshaw-puller and hawker.

Career 
Saha joined the Bengal Ambulance Corps and went to the World War I. He left Kolkata in 1915 for Mesopotamia. He earned a medal and citation from King George the Fifth for his distinctive performance.
As a reward for his services rendered to the wounded, he was commissioned in 1916 in the newly formed Bengal Regiment. He got a job in the Indian Railway department as a war veteran. He received "Sword of Honour" award for saving some British officers from a camp fire. After serving for about five years, Shaha retired from the army and served British Railway as a ticket collector until 1931.

In 1932, he started his coal business. He later acquired a dealership for coal business in Kolkata. In four years, he became a well-established coal businessman in Kolkata.
He diversified his business in different sectors including passenger launch, river transport, dockyard, food grain, and jute. He bought a ship named Bengal River. He was appointed one of the agents to buy food grains for the Government. He bought three powerhouses at Narayanganj, Mymensingh and Comilla and owned the George Anderson Company of Narayanganj that used to make jute bales.

Philanthropy 
In 1938, Saha founded a charitable hospital at his native village Mirzapur on the river Lauhajang. On 27 July 1944 the hospital which had 20 beds was opened by Richard Casey, Baron Casey, the then Governor of Bengal. Saha named it Kumudini Hospital, after his mother Kumudini whose suffering from lack of medical care inspired him to establish a hospital for the poor, so that people, especially women, would not suffer the way his mother had. During the famine of 1943–1944, he maintained 275 gruel houses to feed the hungry for 8 months. As of 2010, the hospital has 750 beds and continues to serve the poor, providing them with free beds, meals and treatment and charging only nominally for surgical procedures. If the hospital was flooded, Ranadaprasad made the doctor's treat the patients on the top floors. He didn't care about death rates as many hospitals did and made sure no one was ever turned back. The Maternity Wing of the Dhaka Combined Military Hospital was established with his financial support.

To spread female education he founded in 1942 a fully residential school at Mirzapur and named it Bharateswari Bidyapith after Bharateswari Devi, his grandmother. In 1945, this institution was renamed to Bharateswari Homes. It has 1200 seats as of 2010 and is renowned for producing well-rounded, socially responsible students who have gone on to excel in their respective fields. Founded the Kumudini College at Tangail in 1943 and Debendra College at Manikganj District in 1944 to commemorate his mother and father respectively. He also set up the Mirzapur Pilot Boys' School, Mirzapur Pilot Girls' School, and Mirzapur Degree College.

In 1947, Saha placed all his companies in a trust by the name of Kumudini Welfare Trust (KWT), with the earnings from the income generating activities such as jute baling press and a river transportation business, being used to run the welfare activities.

The full extent of his philanthropic activities is not known even by his own family. In 1944, he donated BDT  to the Red Cross. His family often learns about them when they receive letters or calls from organizations informing them about some large donations he had made or some way in which he had helped them.

Death 
In April 1971, during the Liberation War of Bangladesh, despite a good working relationship with the Pakistani authorities as well as all preceding and successive governments, Saha, with his 26-year-old son Bhavani Prasad Saha, was picked up by the Pakistani occupation army. They returned home after about a week, but were picked up again a day later on 7 May, after which they were never heard from again. Saha's daughter-in-law, Srimati Saha, was widowed at the age of 20, four years into her marriage. Her only child, son Rajiv, was three years old at the time. The death of Ranadaprasad Saha remained a mystery as his body was never found, and neither was his son's.

Awards and honours 
In appreciation of his humanitarian work the British Government conferred on Saha the title of Rai Bahadur. In 1978, he was posthumously awarded the Independence day award by the Government of Bangladesh as a recognition of his social works.

References

External links 
 Kumudini Welfare Trust of Bengal (BD) Limited website
 

1896 births
1971 deaths
People from Dhaka
Bengali Hindus
Bangladeshi Hindus
Bangladeshi philanthropists
People killed in the Bangladesh Liberation War
Rai Bahadurs
Recipients of the Independence Day Award
20th-century philanthropists